Module theory is the branch of mathematics in which modules are studied. This is a glossary of some terms of the subject.

See also: Glossary of linear algebra, Glossary of ring theory, Glossary of representation theory.

A

B

C

D

E

F

G

H

I

J

K

L

M

N

P

Q

R

S

T

U

W

Z

References
 
 
 
 
 

Module
 
Wikipedia glossaries using description lists